Rahila Hameed Khan Durrani is a Pakistani lawyer and politician. She was elected as the first ever female Speaker of the Provincial Assembly of Balochistan on 24 December 2015.  Ms. Durrani is an exceptional humanitarian, a visionary philanthropist and a legendary voice raiser for women rights in Balochistan. She has served as the first member (from Balochistan) of National Commission on Status of Women (1999) and has worked a lot for the cause of women. She is a journalist, social activist, lawyer, sports woman. She was awarded Tamgha-i-Imtiaz. (TI) by the Government of Pakistan.

Early life
Durrani was born in Quetta in 1968. She received her M.A and L.L.B from the University of Balochistan. She was appointed as a member of the Balochistan Assembly on a seat reserved for women as a member of the ruling Pakistan Muslim League (Q) party, and re-appointed in 2008 and 2013. She became Balochistan's Minister for Prosecution in her second term. She is a patron of Chiltan Adventurers Association Balochistan and the Pakistan Canoe and Kayak Federation She is Balochistan's first female athlete medal winner in canoeing sports on National level.

See also
List of members of the Provincial Assembly of Balochistan (2013–2018)

References

External links
Provincial Assembly Speaker profile

Living people
Pakistan Muslim League (N) politicians
Pakistani lawyers
People from Quetta
University of Balochistan alumni
1968 births
Balochistan MPAs 2013–2018
Women members of the Provincial Assembly of Balochistan
Women legislative speakers
Speakers of the Provincial Assembly of Balochistan
21st-century Pakistani women politicians